What's Not Plastic? is the fifth release by Louisville, Kentucky band, Digby. It was the first in The Wake in the Street trilogy, which was recorded in May 2006 in a working funeral home (Ratterman Funeral Homes) in Louisville. What's Not Plastic? was released on November 14, 2007. It was produced by Digby and engineered by Kevin Ratterman (Elliot, Your Black Star, Wax Fang). The band also shot home-made videos for each song.

Track listing
 "New America"
 "Self Evaluation"
 "Bad Swing"
 "Knocking at Your Door"
 "How Long?"

Personnel
Paul Moeller – vocals, guitar
Rich Oeffinger – guitars
Ben Schneider – bass
Mark Book – drums
John Shiner – keys

References

External links
 https://www.myspace.com/digby
 https://www.facebook.com/people/Digby-Digby/533132245
 http://www.twowaymonologues.com/reviews/digby/whats-not-plastic/
 http://www.popmatters.com/pm/review/digby-whats-not-plastic/
 http://www.antimusic.com/reviews/08/Digby.shtml
 http://neufutur.com/?p=1240

Digby (band) albums
2007 albums